Mohammad Nawaz Alam (born 1967) is an Indian politician belonging to Rashtriya Janata Dal (RJD). He was elected as a member of Bihar Legislative Assembly from Arrah in 2015.

References

Living people
Rashtriya Janata Dal politicians
Bihar MLAs 2015–2020
1967 births